The 2013–14 Union Dutchmen ice hockey team represented Union College in the 2013–14 NCAA Division I men's ice hockey season.  The Dutchmen were coached by Rick Bennett, who was in his third season as head coach.  His assistant coaches were Joe Dumais, Jason Tapp, and John Ronan.  The team captain was Mat Bodie and the assistant captains were Daniel Carr and Shayne Gostisbehere.  The Dutchmen played their home games at Frank L. Messa Rink at Achilles Center and were members of the ECAC Hockey conference.

Season
Union finished the regular season with a record of 32 wins, 6 losses, and 1 tie, winning the ECAC regular season title.  Seeded first in the 2014 ECAC Tournament, the Dutchmen received a bye into the quarterfinals, where they defeated Dartmouth in a two-game series.  In the final rounds in Lake Placid, Union defeated Cornell in the semifinals and Colgate in the final to win the ECAC championship and an automatic bid to the NCAA Tournament.

In the NCAA Tournament, the Dutchmen were the third overall seed and top seed in the East Regional.  Union easily beat Vermont in the first round, 5–2, and defeated Providence the next day, 3–1, to advance to the Frozen Four.  In the national semifinal in Philadelphia, the Dutchmen fell behind early to Boston College, before taking the lead in the second period and holding off a late push by the Eagles to win, 5–4.  Union faced Minnesota in the national title game.  After falling behind 2–1 early in the first period, the Dutchmen scored three goals within 1:54 late in the first period to take the lead.  Union won the game, 7–4, to clinch the school's first national championship.  Defenseman Shayne Gostisbehere was named the tournament's Most Outstanding Player; goalie Colin Stevens, defenseman Mat Bodie, and forward Daniel Ciampini were also named to the All-Tournament Team.

Roster

|}

Standings

Schedule and results

|-
!colspan=12 style=""| Regular Season
|-

|-
!colspan=12 style=""| ECAC Tournament
|-

|-
!colspan=12 style=""| NCAA Tournament
|-

2014 national championship

Minnesota vs. Union

Statistics

Skaters

Goaltenders

Rankings

Note: USCHO did not release a poll in week 1, USA Today did not release a poll in week 12.

Players drafted into the NHL

2014 NHL Entry Draft

References

Union Dutchmen ice hockey seasons
Union
Union
Union
Union
Union
Union